WIBG-FM (94.3 FM, "Wibbage 94.3") is a radio station broadcasting a classic hits music format. WIBG is licensed to Avalon, New Jersey, United States.  The station is currently owned by WIBG Limited Liability Company and features local programming.  Its studios are in Ocean City, New Jersey and its transmitter is located west of the city.

Operating with 6,000 watts, the station can be heard from Manahawkin in Ocean County to the north; south to Lewes, Delaware and as far west as Vineland in Cumberland County.

History
The station signed on the air March 29, 1976, as WWOC with a beautiful music format until March 27, 1992, when it was changed to WXNJ. On February 3, 1993, the station reverted its call sign back to WWOC; on March 3, 2001, to WWZK; on February 17, 2005, to WILW; and on August 19, 2009, to the current WIBG-FM,

The programming is Classic Hits of the 80's, with songs from the 60s and 70s sprinkled in. Using a personality approach reminiscent of the "WIBBAGE" format from the Philadelphia station of the 50s, 60s and 70s (that station is now WNTP (990)). WIBG-FM transmits on 94.3 MHz.

The call sign changed in August 2009 from WILW commensurate with a relocation of the transmitter site from Swainton (Middle Township), New Jersey, to Palermo (Upper Township), New Jersey, and doubling of transmission power to 6,000 Watts. Construction of the new transmitter was completed in early November 2009.  The station coverage then reached both Cape May and Atlantic Counties along with parts of Ocean and Cumberland Counties, whereas before the station only had a strong signal in Cape May County. The Philly WIBBAGE legacy remains a very powerful brand among tens of thousands of listeners each day. Owner and News Director Rick Brancadora began his radio ownership in 1992 with WIBG, now the most powerful AM broadcast station in the Atlantic City-Cape May markets.

WIBG's full-time, on-air talent consists of longtime South Jersey radio personalities Jerry Beebe in the morning; Rick Rock in mid-day; Chris Nagle for the afternoon drive; and Ken Schaffer in the evening, and from midnight to 6 AM, John Lockwood.  There are various local and national weekend programs, including......The Billio "Insanity Reigns/Rains/Reins Supreme Show",Saturday and Sunday 6-8 PM, Brett Parker,,; "Sunday Side Up with John Lockwood", Maryann McElroy " Mary Mac on Sunday afternoons,  Nationally syndicated show host Dick Bartley.   Jerry Beebe, South Jersey Morning show veteran of 35 years. Rick Rock is one of the most popular on-air personalities with one of the most recognized voices in South Jersey. Chris Nagle's afternoon  drive show is among the most popular in the market with roots in South Jersey Radio.  Ken Schaffer's  radio roots are in South Jersey, and he is a pioneer in the mobile entertainment industry as founder of Schaffer Sound Productions in suburban Philadelphia. John Lockwood, originally from the Midwest, now has the distinction of being one of the few, if not only, overnight radio personalities in the market.

References

External links

Classic hits radio stations in the United States
IBG-FM